Albrecht von Johansdorf (c. 1180 – c. 1209) was a Minnesänger and a minor noble in the service of Wolfger of Erla. Documents indicate that his life included the years 1185 to 1209. He may have known Walther von der Vogelweide and is believed to have participated in a crusade. He is known to have written at least five "recruitment" songs in Middle High German, most likely for the Third Crusade.  His "Song 2" owes a debt to the structure and melody from a song in Old French by trouvère poet Conon de Béthune.  His "Song 5", which mentions the capture of Jerusalem, may suggest that he wrote around 1190.  Von Johansdorf's Minnelieder conform outwardly to the standard pattern of man subordinating himself to the woman above him and is responsible for the classical formulation of "the educative value of Minnedienst" (daz ir deste werde sit und da bi hochgemuot). His integrity and warmth of heart are most evident in poems referring to the departure for the crusade.

References

Further reading
The poetry of Albrecht von Johansdorf, by Hugo Bekker, 

Minnesingers
1180s births
1209 deaths
Year of birth uncertain
Year of death uncertain
German male poets
13th-century German poets
13th-century German composers

Christians of the Third Crusade